Stereotypes of Russians include actual or imagined characteristics of Russians used by people who view Russians as a single and homogeneous group.

Common stereotypes

No sense of humor
Russians are often characterized as being grim, stoic, and humorless. While smiling is seen as an obligatory gesture of friendliness in Western countries, smiling at a stranger in Russia is regarded as insincere and is reserved for close friends.

Crime and corruption
Following the collapse of the Soviet Union, Russia experienced a sharp increase in crime during the 1990s as the nation's economy shifted from state socialism to market capitalism. Russia's homicide rate was among the highest in the world in 2003. However, crime rates in Russia have since subsided to moderate levels since Vladimir Putin's presidency. Russia has also gained notoriety for organized crime.

Russia has also gained a negative reputation for perceived corruption, particularly under the regime of Vladimir Putin. Transparency International assigned Russia the lowest score of any European country in their Corruption Perceptions Index for 2021.

Women
Russian women are often stereotyped as being materialistic and obsessed with beauty. They are also stereotyped as being docile, a value that was instilled in girls during the era of the Soviet Union.

Cold weather
Due to Russia's proximity to the Arctic, the nation's climate is often associated with snow and cold temperatures. The town of Omyakon in Sakha holds the distinction of being the coldest permanently inhabited settlement on Earth. Russian winter has contributed to the failure of several military invasions of Russia, most notably The French Empire and Nazi Germany. However, the majority of Russia is classified under a humid continental climate. Areas on the Black Sea coast, including the popular resort of Sochi, possess a humid subtropical climate.

Vodka
Vodka is Russia's national alcoholic drink, and the country leads the world in vodka consumption. Vodka has been blamed for 8,000 alcohol related deaths in Russia.

Bears

The Russian Bear has historically been used as a symbol of Russia. Ironically, its association with Russia did not originate in Russia, but in the Western world, where it was often used as a negative representation to depict Russia as "big, brutal, and clumsy". However, Russians have also used the bear to represent their country, particularly in the Russian Federation, where it has been used as a "symbol of national pride".. Misha the bear cub was the mascot of the 1980 Moscow Olympic Games.

Communism
The emergence of the Soviet Union as the world's first nominally Communist state has led to a lasting association of Communism with Russia, even after the collapse of the Soviet Union. The Communist Party of the Russian Federation remains the second-largest political party in Russia. Russians are often stereotyped as holding nostalgia for the Soviet Union; a 2018 poll showed that 66% of Russians regretted the fall of the Soviet Union.

Russians are also stereotyped as addressing each other as "comrade". The term has a long-lasting association with Communism after the Bolsheviks began using it to address those sympathetic to the revolution and the Soviet state. By the mid-1920s, the term had become commonplace in the Soviet Union, used indiscriminately similar to the words "Mister" and "Sir" in English. Following the collapse of the Soviet Union, the term has still been used as a standard term of address in the Russian Armed Forces and Police of Russia.

Literature
Russian literature is known for its length and often bleak depictions of human experiences. Leo Tolstoy and Fyodor Dostoevsky are among some of the most renowned Russian authors.

References

Ethnic and racial stereotypes
Cultural depictions of Russian people
Russian culture